Alfredo José Mora Mercado (born April 20, 1933 in Juana Díaz, Puerto Rico - November 1, 2001 in Ponce, Puerto Rico) was a lawyer and a high ranking officer who became the 10th Adjutant General of the Puerto Rico National Guard.

In 1954 earned a B.A. in Arts from the University of Puerto Rico and a Doctorate in Law from University of Puerto Rico School of Law. He worked as law professor at the University of Puerto Rico School of Law and at the Pontifical Catholic University of Puerto Rico School of Law.

He was commissioned as a second lieutenant to the United States Army in 1955 thru the Army ROTC program. Served two years on Active duty mostly in Europe.

Joined the Puerto Rico National Guard on October 24, 1958. Went thru many positions in the Puerto Rico Guard until was named as commanding officer of the 92nd Infantry Brigade (Separate) on May 6, 1983.

Was promoted to Brigadier General on August 2, 1984 and the following year was named Adjutant General of the Puerto Rico National Guard by governor Rafael Hernández Colón.

During his tenure as Adjutant General of the Puerto Rico National Guard, BG Alfredo J. Mora led 300 National Guardsmen to the Mameyes Landslide relief effort that occurred on October 7, 1985.

Retired from the Puerto Rico National Guard in 1990 after 35 years of service. Among Alfredo J. Mora military awards he earned the Meritorious Service Medal, the Humanitarian Service Medal and the Armed Forces Reserve Medal with Gold Hourglass device.

In his civilian life Alfredo J. Mora worked as a lawyer with the Mora & Cangiano Law Group.

References
1. Negroni, Hector Andres (1992). Historia militar de Puerto Rico. Coleccion Encuentros (in Spanish). Sociedad Estatal Quinto Centenario. .

1933 births
2001 deaths
National Guard (United States) generals
People from Juana Díaz, Puerto Rico
Puerto Rico Adjutant Generals
Puerto Rico National Guard personnel
Puerto Rican Army personnel
20th-century Puerto Rican lawyers
Puerto Rican military officers
Recipients of the Meritorious Service Medal (United States)
Recipients of the Humanitarian Service Medal
University of Puerto Rico alumni
University of Puerto Rico faculty